"Old Blue" (also known as "Old Dog Blue") is an old folk song, believed to have originated from the minstrel shows of the late 19th century. A 1928 version by Jim Jackson, entitled "Old Dog Blue", appears on the Anthology of American Folk Music album. Since this early recording, a number of covers and variations of this song have been recorded. In his 1985 play, Fences, August Wilson uses Jim Jackson's version as a leitmotif, and the play's central character (who had a dog named Blue as a boy) says his father originated the song.

Various versions
 Joan Baez, Joan Baez, Vol. 2 (1961)
 The Byrds, Dr. Byrds & Mr. Hyde (1969)
 Furry Lewis, Shake 'Em On Down (1961)
 Guy Carawan, Songs with Guy Carawan (1950)
 Ramblin' Jack Elliott, I Stand Alone (2006)
David Wiffen, David Wiffen At The Bunkhouse Coffeehouse, Vancouver BC (1965)
 Johnny Duncan, Vintage Rock Nº 23 - EPs Collectors "Johnny Duncan's Tennessee Song Bag" (1957)
 Cisco Houston, Songs to Grow On, Vol. 3: This Land Is My Land (1951)
 Bill Staines, One More River (1998)
 Anne Hills, Never Grow Up (1998)
 The Dillards, Live!!!! Almost!!! (1964)
 Bob Gibson and Bob Camp, Bob Gibson and Bob Camp at The Gate of Horn (1961)
 Sam Hinton, Whoever Shall Have Some Good Peanuts (2006)
 Pete Seeger, American Favorite Ballads, Vol. 3 (1957)
 Lonnie Pitchford, The Harry Smith Connection: A Live Tribute To The Anthology Of American Folk Music (1998)
 Dave Van Ronk, Somebody Else, Not Me (1980)
 JJ Cale, Guitar Man (1996)
 Georgia Ruth, Week of Pines (2013)
 Appears on Disney Children's Favorite Songs 2 (1979) as a children's song.
 Emerson, Lake & Palmer; Greg Lake in live versions performances of "Take a Pebble"  (1971)  
 Ian & Sylvia
 Charlie Parr, I Ain't Dead Yet (2016)
 Peter, Paul & Mary, In Concert (1964), as "Blue"
 Frankie Laine, Balladeer (1959)
 Shawn Phillips, Shawn (1966)

References

External links
 Old Blue at Keefer's Folk Music Index

American folk songs
Songs about dogs